Dato' Mohd Mokhtar bin Dahari  (13 November 1953 – 11 July 1991) was a Malaysian footballer. He played for F.A. Selangor for most of his football career. He is considered a legendary footballer in Malaysian history, tallying 89 goals in 142 full international matches and took his team to an Elo rating of 61 in 1977. A prolific forward, he was nicknamed Supermokh due to his playing skills and strength. Mokhtar is the all-time top scorer for the Malaysian national team.

On 29 June 2021, FIFA acknowledged Dahari as the third top scorer of all time at international level, with a total of 89 goals. As of September 2022, his international tally is behind only Cristiano Ronaldo, Ali Daei and Lionel Messi.

Early life 
Born on 13 November 1953 at Setapak, Selangor (present-day in Kuala Lumpur). Mokhtar was the first born son of couple Aminah Sharikan and Dahari Abeng. His father, Dahari, worked as a lorry driver but did not earn very much to support his family. His family moved to Kampung Pandan in Kuala Lumpur when Mokthar was 11 years old. Upon moving, he attended secondary school at Victoria Institution in the city and began to show interest and talent in playing football at an early age. He played for his school and later for his home state, the F.A. Selangor.

Career

Playing career 

Mokhtar first played for F.A. Selangor in the Burnley Cup, which they won. He was later asked to play for the club regularly where he became the top scorer in his first season playing for F.A. Selangor. He helped the club win many tournaments, mainly the Malaysia Cup with 10 titles and scoring 177 goals altogether. He also played for Kelab Sultan Sulaiman, PKNS, Talasco and Kwok Yik Bank in the FAM Cup and Selangor League. In proving his loyalty for the team, he was quoted as saying: "I live and die for Selangor". Later, he was selected to play for the national team of Malaysia. He was only 19 years old when he first played for the national team in an international game, with his first game against the Sri Lanka national football team in 1972. He helped Malaysia to win bronze in the 1974 Asian Games and two gold medals in the Southeast Asian Games in 1977 and 1979 respectively. He even scored both goals in the 2–0 Malaysia Selection against Arsenal F.C. match friendly game in 1975 that led to rumours that top clubs in England were interested in him. After the game, he had an offer from one of the European giants, the Real Madrid C.F. but declined to join because of his patriotism  and love for his home club of Selangor. Known for his speed and accuracy, Mokhtar was named Best Asian Striker by World Soccer magazine when he was 23 years old.

Mokhtar was famous for his speed and roars of Supermokh from the crowds were common, with many of the younger generation idolising him with some trying to imitate his moves on the field. Mokhtar once scored a goal for Malaysia from the halfway line beating Joe Corrigan with an incredible shot in a 1–1 draw against England B in 1978, dribbling past half of the opposing team coached by Bobby Robson.  Also memorable was when Gordon Hill praised Mokhtar as "Hero Dahari" in Shoot! magazine in his column after the England B tour in 1978.

Coaching career 
After Mokhtar started having injury problems, he became a local coach to help the younger generation become better footballers.

One of his trainees was a young Roshan Thiran, future Co-founder and CEO of Leaderonomics, who regularly speaks on his experiences playing under Mokhtar. Mokhtar asked his former F.A. Selangor partner, Reduan Abdullah to write a book about his life and his career. Mokhtar also coached for F.A. Selangor at times. After his retirement, he became a player-coach for Kwong Yik Bank.

Retirement 
Mokhtar Dahari retired in May 1986 after winning the Malaysia Cup for F.A. Selangor. After the award giving ceremony, Mokhtar went to the club's president and proceeded to give him his number 10 jersey, telling the president to let the club keep the jersey for him. He came out of retirement in January 1987 to play one more season for F.A. Selangor.

Personal life 
Before becoming a professional footballer, he played other sports such as badminton, sepak takraw, and hockey. Mokhtar worked for PKNS in the afternoon and played football in the evening. He earned little during his time with PKNS. He later quit PKNS and worked for Kwong Yik Bank to gain better prospects for himself and his family. Mokhtar met Tengku Zarina Tengku Ibrahim through friends. After knowing her for 10 years, they finally got married on 24 February 1979. He then became the father of three children: Nur Azera (the eldest daughter), Mohd Reza (the eldest son) and Nur Arina (the youngest daughter).

Illness and death 
Mokhtar began having throat problems and went to the hospital to find out what the problem was. Doctors diagnosed him as having motor neurone disease (MND) with the discovery only being told to him and his wife. He then went to London with his wife in an attempt to cure his condition. After three years battling the disease and his condition worsening, Mokhtar died at the Subang Jaya Medical Centre (SJMC) on 11 July 1991. The press reported Mokhtar's suffering from muscular dystrophy as the cause of his death. His body was laid to rest at Taman Keramat Permai Muslim Cemetery in Taman Keramat, Ampang, Selangor. His life journey and the real cause of death was only revealed for the first time in a documentary called "The Untold Truth About Supermokh" in the National Geographic Channel on 30 August 2010, about 19 years after his death.

Honours

Club 
F.A. Selangor 
 First Division (1):
 Champion: 1984
 Malaysia Cup (10):
 Winner: 1972, 1973, 1975, 1976, 1978, 1979, 1981, 1982, 1984, 1986
 Charity Cup (Sultan Haji Ahmad Shah Cup) (2):
 Winner: 1985, 1987

International 
 Pestabola Merdeka
Winners: 1973, 1974, 1976, 1979
 King's Cup
Winners: 1972, 1978
 SEA Games
Winners: 1977, 1979
Runners-up: 1981
 Asian Games
Bronze Medal: 1974

Individual 
 National Sportsman Award 1976
 World Soccer: The Best Asian Striker 1976
 AFC Asian All Stars: 1982
 AFC Century Club 1999
 IFFHS Men Best Malaysian Players of the Century (1901-2000)
 IFFHS Men's All Time Malaysia Dream Team: 2022 
 OCM Hall of Fame: 2004
 Ex-State & Ex-National Footballers Association of Malaysia Honour: 2011
FourFourTwo's Top 25 Malaysian Players of All Time (1st Place): 2014
 Goal.com The best Malaysia XI of all time: 2020

Records 
 Selangor all-time top scorer: 177 goals
 Malaysia national football team  all-time top scorer: 89 goals
 Southeast Asia all-time top scorer for men's national teams: 89 goals
 Asia-Pacific all-time top scorer for men's national teams: 89 goals
 20th century all-time top scorer for men's national teams (1901-2000): 89 goals
 Former all-time top scorer for men's national teams between 27 October 1980 until 16 June 2004 after surpassing Ferenc Puskás 84 goals.
 Former Asian all-time top scorer for men's national teams between 2 May 1979 until 16 June 2004 after surpassing Kunishige Kamamoto 75 goals.

Orders 
  :
  Member of the Order of the Defender of the Realm (A.M.N.) (1977)
  :
  Knight Companion of the Order of the Crown of Pahang (D.I.M.P.) - Dato' (2000-posthumously)
  :
  Recipient of the Meritorious Service Medal (P.J.K.) (1977)
  Knight Companion of the Order of Sultan Salahuddin Abdul Aziz Shah (D.S.S.A.) - Dato' (2001-posthumously)

Career statistics

International goals

During his international career, Mokhtar scored a total of 125 goals in 167 appearances for Malaysia (including matches played against club sides, national 'B' teams and selection teams). Against other nations' national 'A' teams, he scored 89 goals in 142 appearances. This made him once the world's top scorer for men's national teams.

Malaysia
Scores and results list Malaysia's goal tally first.

Filmography

Legacy 
Several places and honours were named after him, including:
 The Mokhtar Dahari Community Square (Dataran Komuniti Mokhtar Dahari), a community hall located at Kampung Pandan, Kuala Lumpur was named after him where Mokhtar used to stay, occasionally playing football there.
 There is a futsal court called Gelanggang Mokhtar Dahari (Moktar Dahari Futsal Court) located at Putrajaya Futsal Complex in Putrajaya.
 There is a national football academy was named after him, Mokhtar Dahari National Football Academy (Akademi Bola Sepak Negara Mokhtar Dahari) located at Gambang, Pahang was established on 10 April 2014.
 The Shah Alam-Batu Arang Highway which connecting Shah Alam and Puncak Alam was renamed Persiaran Mokhtar Dahari in 2014.
 In 2014, Google celebrates his 61st birthday. There is also a theatre showcase his legendary football career in Istana Budaya called "Super Mokh" portrayed by Malaysian actor named Awie.

Footnotes

See also
 List of top international men's football goalscorers by country
 List of men's footballers with 100 or more international caps
 List of men's footballers with 50 or more international goals
 List of progression men's association football goalscoring record

References

Bibliography 
 Mokhtar Dahari Wira Bolasepak Negara. Zabidi Ismail. (in Malay). Dewan Bahasa dan Pustaka (1999). 
 Mokhtar Dahari: Legenda Bola Sepak Malaysia. Zinnitulniza Abdul Kadir. (in Malay). Institute of Translation & Books of Malaysia (2013).

Further reading 
 Mokhtar Dahari: Permata bola sepak negara  Berita Harian
Remembering 'SuperMokh' 25 years later  Sports247

External links 
 
 
 Biography at Selangor FC.com 

1953 births
1991 deaths
Deaths from motor neuron disease
Neurological disease deaths in Malaysia
Malaysian footballers
1976 AFC Asian Cup players
Malaysia international footballers
Malaysian people of Malay descent
Malaysian Muslims
People from Selangor
Selangor FA players
Association football forwards
Asian Games bronze medalists for Malaysia
Asian Games medalists in football
Southeast Asian Games gold medalists for Malaysia
Southeast Asian Games silver medalists for Malaysia
Southeast Asian Games medalists in football
Southeast Asian Games bronze medalists for Malaysia
Members of the Order of the Defender of the Realm
Footballers at the 1974 Asian Games
Medalists at the 1974 Asian Games
Competitors at the 1973 Southeast Asian Peninsular Games
FIFA Century Club